Peretz v. United States, 501 U.S. 923 (1991), was a Supreme Court of the United States case. The Court affirmed that a defendant in a federal criminal trial on a felony charge must affirmatively object to the supervising of jury selection by a magistrate judge, ruling that it is not enough that the defendant merely acquiesce to the magistrate's involvement in his case for a court to reverse a conviction for this reason.

Background
Peretz and a co-defendant had been indicted on smuggling four kilograms of heroin into the United States. The district judge who oversaw the trial asked if there was any objection to a magistrate conducting the jury selection, and Peretz did not make an objection. The district judge conducted the actual trial. Peretz did not object to the magistrate conducting the jury selection until he reached the court of appeals. The court of appeals disagreed, reasoning that the Federal Magistrates Act required him to object specifically to the involvement of a magistrate judge in his case. Since Peretz had not objected in the district court to the magistrate's involvement in the jury selection, the Second Circuit ruled that he had waived the objection.

Opinion of the Court
In an opinion by Justice Stevens, the Court upheld Peretz's conviction.

Consent allows the magistrate to act
There exists a personal right for a litigant in federal court to insist on the involvement of a judge who has been appointed by the President and confirmed by the Senate in the manner contemplated by the Constitution. However, the Federal Magistrates Act authorizes magistrate judges to undertake "additional duties" when the parties in a case consent. For magistrates to undertake their routine tasks is a great relief to federal courts in processing their caseloads. When the parties consent, magistrates may supervise entire misdemeanor trials. "These duties [in supervising an entire trial] are comparable in responsibility and importance to presiding over voir dire at a felony trial." Thus, supervising voir dire is one of the "additional duties" Congress authorized magistrate judges to undertake.

A magistrate at voir dire does not implicate constitutional concerns
Although the involvement of an Article III judge is a personal right, it is a right that can be waived. In the course of a criminal proceeding, defendants are asked to waive many rights; the right to the involvement of an Article III judge at jury selection imposes little marginal cost on him. Furthermore, the decision to involve a magistrate in the first place rests with an Article III judge, and the parties may veto that decision. Article III judges retain "total control and jurisdiction" over the entire process, and must review the magistrate judge's decisions de novo if the parties ask. For the same reason that involving a magistrate judge does not implicate due process concerns (United States v. Raddatz), it does not implicate Article III concerns either.

Dissenting opinions

Justice Marshall's dissent
Justice Marshall disagreed that the parties' consent could vitiate the involvement of a magistrate. Congress did not, after all, specify jury selection in the Federal Magistrates Act. For Justice Marshall, the defendant's consent did not change this. Congress limited a magistrate's involvement to misdemeanors and other relatively minor roles, and jury selection is a major event in a felony trial. Furthermore, Congress did not allow an Article III judge to review the magistrate's involvement in jury selection. When the Court had previously ruled that the defendant's consent was the deciding factor in the propriety of a magistrate's involvement, it had also rested on a district judge's review of that involvement.  Because there is none with respect to jury selection, a defendant's consent was not enough for Justice Marshall to extend a magistrate's involvement any further than Congress had expressly allowed.  

Furthermore, Justice Marshall disputed that a magistrate's involvement in jury selection was consistent with Article III. The right to an Article III judge rests on his political independence and his role as a check and balance against the other two branches. The first of these is a personal right and therefore waivable. The second, however, is structural, and therefore unwaivable. Justice Marshall was willing to accede to the involvement of a magistrate if there would be de novo review in the district court. To justify a magistrate's involvement based on consent in the absence of judicial review went too far for Justice Marshall.

Justice Scalia's dissent
Because the Court's previous decision came while Peretz's case was pending in the court of appeals, Justice Scalia reasoned that the magistrate judge's involvement was plain error that affected Peretz's substantial rights. In Justice Scalia's view, the Government conceded that the Federal Magistrates Act did not authorize the magistrate's involvement in Peretz's jury selection, as Justice Marshall observed. Accordingly, Justice Scalia would have overturned Peretz's conviction.

See also
 List of United States Supreme Court cases, volume 501
 List of United States Supreme Court cases
 Lists of United States Supreme Court cases by volume
 List of United States Supreme Court cases by the Rehnquist Court

References

External links
 
 

United States Constitution Article Three case law
United States Supreme Court cases
United States Supreme Court cases of the Rehnquist Court
United States criminal procedure case law
1991 in United States case law